Steven Cash (born May 9, 1989) is an ice sled hockey player from the United States. Cash is in his 13th season with the U.S. National Sled Hockey Team since making his debut in the 2005–06 season. Cash plays goalie and was a member of the U.S. teams that won gold in the 2010 Winter Paralympic Games in Vancouver, 2014 Winter Paralympic Games in Sochi, and 2018 Winter Paralympic Games in Pyeongchang. He was also part of the team that won the bronze medal in the 2006 Winter Paralympics in Torino.

Life 
Cash's right leg was amputated when he was 3 years old as a result of a form of bone cancer called osteosarcoma. Cash was a 2007 graduate of Ritenour High School in Saint Louis, Missouri, where he played goalie for the full-sided ice hockey team. From 2004 to 2011, he was a member of the Disabled Athlete Sports Association Junior Blues Sled Hockey club. In 2010 he was awarded an ESPY for Best Male Athlete with a Disability. During the 2010 Winter Paralympic Games in Vancouver, Cash set a Paralympic record for registering five shutouts and not allowing a single goal.

References

External links
 
 
 
 
 
 

1989 births
Living people
American sledge hockey players
Paralympic sledge hockey players of the United States
Paralympic gold medalists for the United States
Paralympic bronze medalists for the United States
Ice sledge hockey players at the 2006 Winter Paralympics
Ice sledge hockey players at the 2010 Winter Paralympics
Ice sledge hockey players at the 2014 Winter Paralympics
Medalists at the 2006 Winter Paralympics
Medalists at the 2010 Winter Paralympics
Medalists at the 2014 Winter Paralympics
Medalists at the 2018 Winter Paralympics
Paralympic medalists in sledge hockey